Te Llegará Mi Olvido (I Will Forget You) is the eighth studio album by Mexican singer-songwriter Juan Gabriel, originally released in 1978 and re-released in April 1992. Mariachi América de Jesús Rodríguez de Hijar was involved with this production.

Track listing

References

External links 
Juan Gabriel official website
 Te Llegará Mi Olvido on amazon.com
[] Te Llegará Mi Olvido on allmusic.com

1978 albums
Juan Gabriel albums
RCA Records albums
Spanish-language albums